Wu Fan (Simplified Chinese: 吴凡; Hanyu Pinyin: Wú Fán) (December 1923 – 6 December 2015) was a Chinese artist from Chongqing in Sichuan province. He studied guohua with Pan Tianshou and Li Keran and oil painting with Ni Yide. He is most famous as a woodblock print artist. His most famous work 'Dandelion' (1959) demonstrates his mastery of the shuiyin printing style and won gold prize at the Leipzig International Print Competition.

References

1923 births
2015 deaths
Artists from Chongqing